Júnior Leandro Mendieta (born 13 June 1993) is an Argentine professional footballer who plays as a midfielder for Stellenbosch.

Club career
Mendieta started his senior career with Deportivo Morón in Primera B Metropolitana, having played for Quilmes at youth level. His professional debut arrived on 14 February 2015 during a draw with Deportivo Merlo, prior to Mendieta receiving red cards in consecutive appearances in August against Defensores de Belgrano and Platense. A month later, he scored his senior goal against Almagro. Mendieta scored twice more that year, which preceded six goals in fourteen games in the next campaign. On 30 June 2016, Argentine Primera División side Lanús signed Mendieta. He was immediately loaned to Los Andes.

Mendieta remained with Los Andes for the 2016–17 and 2017–18 Primera B Nacional seasons, scoring seven times in forty-six matches in all competitions. After returning to Lanús in June, Mendieta subsequently agreed to rejoin Deportivo Morón; signing a loan contract. He netted twice for Morón, both came in a fixture with Instituto in November 2018, across nineteen appearances. Mendieta had a third loan spell away from Lanús in 2019–20, joining Atlético de Rafaela for twelve months in July 2019. One goal in eighteen matches followed, in a campaign that was curtailed due to the COVID-19 pandemic.

Mendieta's contract with Lanús expired on 30 June 2020, with the midfielder subsequently revealing that a potential move to South African Premier Division side Stellenbosch was being finalized; amid interest from Rafaela for a permanent contract. The move to Africa was belatedly confirmed on 30 October. His first appearance arrived on 4 November against SuperSport United, as he replaced Jayden Adams with twenty-five minutes left of an eventual 1–0 defeat. He scored his first goal on 21 November versus Chippa United, before netting his second on 12 February against Golden Arrows.

International career
Mendieta received a call-up to the Argentina U23s for the 2016 Sait Nagjee Trophy in India. However, due to contractual issues, he was deselected prior to the tournament.

Personal life
In 2017, Mendieta was arrested by police after trespassing at Morón Air Base. He was released without charge soon later, having claimed he accidentally entered the base after becoming lost.

Career statistics
.

References

External links

1993 births
Living people
People from Corrientes
Argentine footballers
Association football midfielders
Argentine expatriate footballers
Expatriate soccer players in South Africa
Argentine expatriate sportspeople in South Africa
Primera B Metropolitana players
Primera Nacional players
South African Premier Division players
Deportivo Morón footballers
Club Atlético Lanús footballers
Club Atlético Los Andes footballers
Atlético de Rafaela footballers
Stellenbosch F.C. players
Sportspeople from Corrientes Province